American singer-songwriter and actress Mariah Carey has received many honors and awards throughout her career. Three of her major achievements include: Billboards Artist of the Decade (1990s), World Music Awards' Best Selling Female Artist of the Millennium and a Grammy Award for Best New Artist in 1991. Throughout her career, Carey has won 5 Grammy Awards, 19 World Music Awards and 15 Billboard Music Awards. Carey is also an inductee of the Songwriters Hall of Fame. In 2014, Carey was the eighth most awarded recording artist.

Carey's fifth studio album, Daydream received critical acclaim and the music industry took note of her success. Most notably Carey won many awards at the Billboard Music Awards, including the Hot 100 Singles Artist of the Year, Hot 100 Airplay ("Always Be My Baby"), Hot Adult Contemporary Artist of the Year and Special Award for 16 weeks at number-one for "One Sweet Day". Daydream went on to be one of the best-selling and most acclaimed albums of 1995. Despite this, Carey did not win any Grammy Awards at the 38th Annual Grammy Awards. In 2006, Carey's song "We Belong Together" was nominated for the Grammy Awards for Song of the Year but lost to U2. Vulture called it one of "the greatest Grammys snubs of all time" saying that the song "cemented a career resurgence for [Carey] and has aged flawlessly, becoming one of her best-known songs". The song won for Best R&B Song and Best Female R&B Vocal Performance. Her tenth studio album The Emancipation of Mimi received many award nominations including that for ten Grammy Awards.

Throughout her career, Carey has been honoured several times for her musical and philanthropic work. In 1995, Carey was honoured as the Best-Selling World Recording Artist by the World Music Awards. In 1999, Carey was award a Congressional Award, for her work with The Fresh Air Fund and the New York City Administration for Children's Services. Towards the end of the '90s decade, Carey was named the Artist of the Decade by Billboard with Entertainment Tonight calling it one of her "biggest milestones". In August 2015, Carey was honored with a star on the Hollywood Walk of Fame. In 2017, Carey was honoured at the VH1 Hip Hop Honors for her contributions to R&B and hip-hop genre. In 2019, Carey was honoured by Variety'''s Power of Women for her work with The Fresh Air Fund's Camp Mariah alongside Jennifer Aniston, Awkwafina, and numerous others. Dubbed the "Queen of Christmas" by the media, Carey and her popular song "All I Want For Christmas Is You" set four Guinness World Records in 2019. In 2021, Carey broke three more Guinness Word Records. One of these records was becoming the first artist in history to top the Billboard Hot 100 in four consecutive decades.

Despite music being her primary source of accomplishment, Carey has also received nominations and awards for other works in retail and film. In 2007, Carey released her own fragrance, "M", in which went on to win a Basenotes Fragrance Award for Best Celebrity Women's Fragrance as well as being nominated in three other categories. Carey's first step in acting, for her film Glitter, was received with negative reviews. Carey won a Golden Raspberry Award for Worst Actress. The film is listed in Golden Raspberry Award founder John Wilson's book The Official Razzie Movie Guide as one of the 100 Most Enjoyably Bad Movies Ever Made. Conversely, in 2009, Carey starred in Precious, which went on to win numerous awards. Carey herself won the Breakthrough Performance Award at the Palm Springs International Film Festival for her work in Precious.

 Awards and nominations 

Other awards
Cultural honors
 
{| class="wikitable sortable plainrowheaders"
|- style="background:#ccc; text-align:center;"
|+Name of the honor, year the honor was awarded, category and type of honor
|-
! scope="col" | Honor
! scope="col" | Year
! scope="col" | Category
! scope="col" | Type
! scope="col" class="unsortable"| 
|-
| African-American Film Critics Association
| 2021
| Special Achievement Innovator Award
| 
| align="center"|
|-
| American Black Achievement Awards
| 1991
| Career Achievement Award
| 
| align="center"|
|-
| American Heroes Awards
| 2002
| Ongoing contributions to The Fresh Air Fund
| 
| align="center"| 
|-
| rowspan="2"| American Music Awards
| 2000
| Achievement Award
| 
| align="center" rowspan="2"| 
|-
| 2008
| Honorary Award
| 
|-
|BET Honors
| 2012
| Entertainer Award
| 
| align="center"| 
|-
| rowspan="2"|Billboard Music Awards
| 1999
| Artist of the Decade (1990's)
| 
| align="center" rowspan="2"|
|-
| 2019
| Billboard Icon Award
| 
|-
|Congressional Award
| 1999
| Congressional Horizon Award
| 
| align="center"| 
|-
|GLAAD Media Award
| 2016
| GLAAD Ally Award
| 
| align="center"| 
|-
| Hollywood Walk of Fame
| 2015
| Star on Hollywood Walk of Fame
| 
| align="center"| 
|-
| Ivor Novello Awards
| 2019
| PRS for Music Special International Award
| 
| align="center"| 
|-
|Make-A-Wish Foundation
| 2005
| Wish Icon Award
| 
| align="center"| 
|-
| New York Chapter Recording Academy
| 2005
| Outstanding achievements
| 
| align="center"| 
|-
| NRJ Music Awards
| 2020
| Icon Award
| 
| align="center"| 
|-
|PETA
| 2017
| Angel for Animals Award
| 
| align="center"| 
|-
| Soul Train Music Awards
| 2003
| Quincy Jones Award
| 
| align="center"| 
|-
| Variety's'' Power of Women
| 2019
| Power of Women Award
| 
| align="center"|
|-
| VH1 Hip Hop Honors
| 2017 
| 90's Game Changer
| 
| align="center"| 
|-
| rowspan="6"| World Music Awards
| 1995
| Best Selling World Recording Artist
| 
| align="center" rowspan="6"|
|-
| 1999
| Best Selling Artist of the 90's
| 
|-
| 2000
| Best Selling Female Artist of the Millennium
| 
|-
| 2003
| Diamond Award
| 
|-
| 2008
| Special Achievement Award
| 
|-
| 2014
| Legend Award
|

World records

Notes

References

Bibliography
 

Mariah Carey
Carey, Mariah